Margarites groenlandicus, common name the Greenland margarite or wavy top shell, is a species of sea snail, a marine gastropod mollusk in the family Margaritidae.

There are two subspecies : 
 Margarites groenlandicus groenlandicus (Gmelin, 1791)
 Margarites groenlandicus kurilensis Golikov & Gulbin, 1978
 Margarites groenlandicus umbilicalis Broderip & Sowerby, 1829 (synonym : Margarites umbilicalis Broderip & Sowerby, 1829)

Description
The wavy top shell is thin-shelled and rather small with a maximum length of 1.9 cm (¾ inch) and a compressed spire.  The color of the glossy shell is cream to brown. It contains 4-5 whorls, with the body whorl the largest. The sutures are wavy. The shell is smooth or with about 12 smooth spiral ridges. The broad umbilicus is funnel-shaped. The nacreous aperture is oval with the long axis inclined to the left.  It is also prosocline, i.e. with the growth lines leaning forward (adapically) with respect to the direction of the cone. The outer lip is thin. The sexes are separate but seldom differ externally. They are at the same time hermaphrodites but self-fertilization is prevented by anatomical mechanisms. The species is a suspension or deposit feeder.

Distribution and habitat
This species occurs across the Northern Atlantic Ocean, Greenland, the western coast of Norway, rarely along the British coast, the Gulf of Maine to Massachusetts Bay. It can be found from near the seashore to the bathyal zone.

References

 Gmelin, J. F. 1791. Systema naturae per regna tria naturae. Editio decima tertia. Systema Naturae, 13th ed., vol. 1(6): 3021-3910. Lipsiae.
 Broderip, W. J. and G. B. Sowerby. 1829. Observations on new or interesting Mollusca contained, for the most part, in the museum of the Zoological Society. Zoological Journal 4: 359-379, pl. 9
 Sowerby, G. B., I. 1838. A descriptive catalogue of the species of Leach's genus Margarita. Malacological and Conchological Magazine 1: 23-27. 
 Möller, H. P. C. 1842. Index molluscorum Groenlandiae. Naturhistorisk Tidsskrift 4: 76-97. 
 Baker, F. C. 1919. Mollusca of the Crocker Land Expedition to Northwest Greenland and Grinnell Island. Bulletin of the American Museum of Natural History 41: 479-517, pls. 25-27
 P.J.; Ryland, J.S. (Ed.) (1990). The marine fauna of the British Isles and North-West Europe: 1. Introduction and protozoans to arthropods. Clarendon Press: Oxford, UK. . 627 pp
 Turgeon, D.D., et al. 1998. Common and scientific names of aquatic invertebrates of the United States and Canada. American Fisheries Society Special Publication 26 page(s): 60
 Gofas, S.; Le Renard, J.; Bouchet, P. (2001). Mollusca, in: Costello, M.J. et al. (Ed.) (2001). European register of marine species: a check-list of the marine species in Europe and a bibliography of guides to their identification. Collection Patrimoines Naturels, 50: pp. 180–213

External links
 

groenlandicus
Gastropods described in 1791